Life Isn't All Ha Ha Hee Hee is a three-part BBC television miniseries from 2005, adapted from Meera Syal's 1999 novel of the same name.

Plot
Childhood friends Tania (Laila Rouass), Sunita (Meera Syal) and Chila (Ayesha Dharker), now in their thirties, are each at a crossroads in life. Sunita, the eldest, used to be 'super swot' until she flunked out of university to marry her psychotherapist sweetheart, Akaash (Sanjeev Bhaskar). She now feels trapped by two kids and an unfulfilling job. 'Gob Almighty' Tania is the ambitious career girl who's left her family and community behind. The baby of the gang, Chila, is getting married to Deepak (Ace Bhatti), the man of her dreams. But he has a catalogue of former girlfriends, including Tania.

Cast

Music
The music was composed by Nick Green and Tristin Norwell.  The strings were recorded by Chandru.

Release details
1999, UK, Doubleday, Pub date 1 October 1999, hardback (First edition)

External links

1999 British novels
British novels adapted into television shows
2005 British television series debuts
2005 British television series endings
2000s British drama television series
2000s British television miniseries
Television shows based on British novels
BBC Television shows
Television series by Hat Trick Productions
English-language television shows